This is a list of universities in Iceland.

Universities and colleges
There are seven universities in Iceland as defined by law. No distinction is made between research universities and other tertiary colleges. Both types are referred to as "háskóli" locally.

Graduate schools
Keilir
REYST
University Centre of the Westfjords
United Nations University (selected programmes)

Defunct institutions
Iceland University of Education (Merged with the University of Iceland)
RES – The School for Renewable Energy Science
Technical University of Iceland (Merged with Reykjavík University)

See also 
 List of schools in Iceland

Universities
Iceland
Iceland
Universities